Dave Alford also known as Rockin Dave is an American Heavy Metal Rock drummer, singer, songwriter and producer who has played in the bands Max Havoc, Ratt, Jailhouse, Mod Ev, Kryme and Rough Cutt, whom he rejoined in 2016 upon their reformation.  Alford also contributed to the Hear 'N Aid video project where various heavy metal/ hard rock artists collaborated to raise money for Famine Relief in 1985; produced by Ronnie James Dio. In 2013 Dave reunited with members of Jailhouse to perform on the Monsters of Rock Cruise.   More recently, Dave has reunited with Rough Cutt members for the 2016 Monsterwood Monsters of Rock Cruise.  Dave Alford currently resides in Los Angeles, California and is playing various venues; also supporting his new project Rockin Dave's Hit Factory.

Discography

With Ratt
 The Garage Tape Dayz 78-81 (2000)
 In Your Direction (2004)

With Rough Cutt
Rough Cutt (1985)
Wants You! (1986)
Rough Cutt Live (1996)
Anthology (2008)
Rough Cutt in Japan Live - Piece of My Heart
Rough Cutt MTV Music Video - Piece of My Heart
Rough Cutt MTV Music Video - Never Gonna Die
Rough Cutt MTV Music Video - Double Trouble
Rough Cutt Live at the Rock Palace 1984 - Street Gang Living
Rough Cutt Live in Japan - Dreamin' Again

With Jailhouse
Alive In A Mad World (1989)
Jailhouse (1998)
Jailhouse on Demon Doll Records
Jailhouse on Facebook
Jailhouse MTV Video - Please Come Back to Me
Jailhouse Live - Jailbreak

References

 Vamps in Las Vegas (2013)
 Monsters of Rock (2013)

External links
 Dave Alford Interview
 Dave Alford Official MySpace
 Hear 'n Aid Hear 'N Aid - Wikipedia
 Rough Cutt Rough Cutt - Wikipedia
  Hair Band Rock - 80's Rock Ratt
  All Hard Rock - Ratt
  Rock Detector - Rough Cutt
  Kryme Official My Space

American rock drummers
Rough Cutt members
Ratt members
Living people
1958 births
20th-century American drummers
American male drummers